A Landing Craft Utility (LCU) is a type of boat used by amphibious forces to transport equipment and troops to the shore. They are capable of transporting tracked or wheeled vehicles and troops from amphibious assault ships to beachheads or piers.

Colombia

The Golfo de Tribugá-class landing craft is an LCU developed by COTECMAR for the Colombian National Navy. The vessel class is also known as BDA and an unarmored version for logistical and humanitarian services has also been developed, known as BALC.

Operators
: 5 in service, 1 on order
: 1 in service
: 2 in service

France

The Engin de débarquement amphibie rapide (EDA-R) landing catamaran or L-CAT, entered service in January 2011.

Germany

Germany has two Barbe-class utility landing craft (Type 520), dating from the mid-1960s, which remain in service under the SEK-M Naval Special Forces' command. Five Barbe landing crafts were transferred to Greece at the end of the Cold War.

India

India currently has 3 Kumbhir class LCU and 8 Mk IV class LCU. Last MK IV class of LCU was delivered by GRSE in 2020.

Netherlands

With the launch of the amphibious transport ship  in 1998 there was a need for LCUs. The Dutch LCUs are similar to the British LCU Mk.10 with the bridge being set to one side allowing for a roll-on roll-off design. Until 2005 the Netherlands Marine Corps used the LCU Mark I (NL).

In 2005 and 2006 the five vessels were modernized to the type Mark II. The vessels have been stretched by 9 meters to decrease their draft, which increased their load carrying capacity by 20 tons and allows them to come closer to shore. In addition they were fitted with a strengthened bow ramp, and they can now accommodate the Royal Netherlands Army Leopard 2 A6 main battle tank.
Because of the lengthening of the Mark II, the Rotterdam can take two LCUs (plus three LCVPs) in its dock. The dock of Rotterdams sister ship, HNLMS Johan de Witt, has the capacity to transport two LCUs, but carries four LCVPs in davits.

Russia

Dyugon

The Dyugon-class landing craft are operated by the Russian Navy.

Sweden

Sweden operates 16 small and fast (25 kt) water jet landing craft (Swedish: Lätt trossbåt) with a displacement of 65 tonnes. They are armed with one 12.7 mm machine gun but can also lay out mines and is equipped with depth charges for anti submarine warfare. The vessel type has been exported to the United Arab Emirates.

HSwMS Loke (A344) is a larger vessel with a displacement of 305 tonnes, capable of carrying 150 tonnes. The ship has a crew of 7 and is armed with two 7.62 mm machine guns.

Spain

The Armada has 26 LCM-1E in service since 2001 and has been exported to Australia and Turkey.

United Kingdom

LCU Mk.9
The LCU Mk.9 was built for use on the LPDs  and  where they were operated from the dock in the rear of the ships. Each ship carried four LCUs and four davit mounted LCVPs. The Mk.9 was to see many changes and upgrades during its service including a move from propeller to jet in many cases. The Mk.9 was capable of traveling as an ocean-going vessel and a number would be converted into a version, affectionately known as the "Black Pig", for use in Norway. The crew had full living quarters aboard with galley and heads. The opinion that the successful British amphibious operations during the Falklands War were only possible because of the two LPDs and their landing craft is well documented. The Mk.9, like the LPDs, served longer than ever anticipated, providing the backbone of Britain's amphibious assault capabilities.

Three Mk.9s, pennant numbers 701, 705, and 709, remained in service by 2012. However, by 2014, they had all been withdrawn from service.

LCU Mk.10
The LCU Mk.10 class vessels are operated by the Royal Marines. Deliveries of the class started from 1998 and the fleet currently consists of ten vessels, bearing pennant numbers 1001 to 1010. Both Albion and Bulwark are capable of carrying four LCUs each. These vessels are capable of operating independently for up to 14 days with a range of 600 nautical miles. They are capable of operating worldwide, from Arctic operating areas to tropical operating areas. The Mk.10 differs greatly from the Mk.9 with the bridge being set to the side allowing for a roll-on roll-off design. This greatly increases efficiency over the old Mk.9 as loading of the rear LCUs can take place without the LCUs being launched, the LPD having to dock down to do so, to change over and load up, which was a problem prior to the Falklands landings. The LCU Mk.10 has a 7-man crew and can carry up to 120 Marines or alternatively 1 battle tank or 4 lorries. British assault ships also carry smaller LCVPs on davits to transport troops and light vehicles.

All ten Mk.10s, pennant numbers 1001 to 1010, remain in service as of 2012.

United States

LCU 1466, 1610 and 1627 classes

The LCU 1466, 1610 and 1627 class vessels are operated by the United States Navy at support commands. They are a self-sustaining craft complete with living accommodations and mess facilities for a crew of thirteen. Each LCU is assigned a non-commissioned-officer-in-charge (Craft Master) who is either a chief petty officer or petty officer first class in the boatswain's mate, quartermaster or operations specialist rating. These vessels have bow ramps for onload/offload and can be linked bow to stern gate to create a temporary pier-like structure. Its welded steel hull provides high durability with deck loads of 3,900 kg/m2 (800 pounds per square foot). Arrangement of machinery and equipment has taken into account built-in redundancy in the event of battle damage. 

The craft features two engine rooms separated by a watertight bulkhead to permit limited operation in the event that one engine room is disabled. An anchor system is installed on the starboard side aft to assist in retracting from the beach. These vessels are normally transported to their areas of operation onboard larger amphibious vessels such as LSDs, LHDs and LHAs. The 40-year-old craft will be replaced under LCU 1700 (ex-Surface Connector (X) Recapitalization, or SC(X)R), project starting in 2017.

LCU 2000

The Runnymede-class large landing craft or LCU 2000 class vessels are operated by the United States Army. They transport rolling and tracked vehicles, containers, and outsized and general cargo from ships offshore to shore, as well as to areas that cannot be reached by oceangoing vessels (coastal, harbor, and intercoastal waterways). They can be self-deployed or transported aboard a float-on/float-off vessel. They are classed for full ocean service and one-man engine room operations and built to U.S. Coast Guard standards. The vessel can sustain a crew of 2 warrant officers and 11 enlisted personnel for up to 18 days and 10,000 miles. This class is also equipped with an aft anchor to assist in retracting from the beach.

LCU Class 1700

The LCU 1700-class boats are destined to replace the existing LCU 1610-class of amphibious landing craft on a one-to-one basis. The LCU-1700 is 139 feet long, can reach speeds of 11 knots, has a range of 1,200 nautical miles at 8 knots, and has accommodations for a mixed gender crew of 14. It can carry two M1A1 tanks, or 350 combat troops, or 170 short tons of cargo. 

The contract announcement noted that the LCU 1700s will recapitalize the LCU fleet as a similarly rugged steel craft (to the LCU 1610) with a design life of 30 years. The similarities of these two classes of ships will help the U.S. Navy to improve efficiency and reduce cost of the training programs, operations and overall ownership cost. The craft will enter, exit and be transported in well decks of current and programmed U.S. Navy amphibious warfare ships, for design purposes defined by the dimensions of LHD, LPD, LSD and LHA classes without ship alterations, while transporting loads up to 11 feet high above the craft’s vehicle deck. The contract was awarded to Swiftships in 2018 to design and build the prototype and up to 32 vessels. Work is being performed in Morgan City, Louisiana, and is expected to be completed by November 2023.

References

External links

 Royal Marines – Landing Craft (royalnavy.mod.uk)
U.S. Navy fact sheet

Landing craft